Vellum Thiramai (வெல்லும் திறமை) is a 2022 Indian-Tamil-language reality television show aired on Colors Tamil, Based on Hindi-language Colors TV's show Hunarbaaz: Desh Ki Shaan. Nikki Galrani, Sridhar and Shihan Hussaini as the judges and VJ Andrews and Syamantha Kiran as the hosts.

The show follows the format in which contestants audition in front of three judges and a studio audience. The platform for astounding talent. singing, dance acts, spellbinding magic show, Stunt and much more. A one stop to celebrate various special skills. Up until the semifinal and final rounds, the judges decide whether or not a contestant advances in the competition. It premiered on 4 June and ended with 20 episodes on 30 October 2022 and available for streaming in selected markets on Voot. The First Season was won by Drona Academy.

Overview

Judges and Hosts

Judges

Hosts

Winners 
The First Season was won by Drona Academy lifted the golden trophy with a cash prize of Rs 2.5 lakh, 1st Runner-up was won by JDC a cash prize of Rs 1.24 lakh.

Airing history
The show started airing on Colors Tamil on 4 June 2022 and It aired on every Saturday 19:00 IST. Later its timing changed Starting from Sunday 11 September 2022, the show was shifted to every Sunday 20:00 IST time Slot.

Production

Promotion
The show shoot began in April 2022 and the first promo was released on 1 May 2022 by revealing of the show title name by Bollywood film actress Parineeti Chopra.

References

External links
 

Colors Tamil original programming
Tamil-language television shows
Tamil-language reality television series
2022 Tamil-language television series debuts
Television shows set in Tamil Nadu
2022 Tamil-language television series endings